Karl Conrad Elzer (2 August 1881 – 30 August 1938) was a German film actor.

Elzer was born in Karlsruhe, Baden-Württemberg, Germany and died in Rottach-Egern, Bavaria, Germany at age 57.

Selected filmography
 The Robber Bride (1916)
 The Blue Lantern (1918)
 Bummellotte (1922)
 Maud Rockefeller's Bet (1924)
 Set Me Free (1924)
 Lena Warnstetten (1925)
 The Proud Silence (1925)
 The Humble Man and the Chanteuse (1925)
 Young Blood (1926)
 The Trumpets are Blowing (1926)
 Excluded from the Public (1927)
 Queen Louise (1927)
 Venus in Evening Wear (1927)
 A Girl of the People (1927)
 Luther (1928)
 Morass (1928)
 The Page Boy at the Golden Lion (1928)
 Indizienbeweis (1929)
 Hungarian Nights (1929)
 The Hero of Every Girl's Dream (1929)
 Vendetta (1929)
 Queen of Fashion (1929)
 End of the Rainbow (1930)
 The Emperor's Sweetheart (1931)
 Miss Madame (1934)

Bibliography
 Jung, Uli & Schatzberg, Walter. Beyond Caligari: The Films of Robert Wiene. Berghahn Books, 1999.

External links

1881 births
1938 deaths
German male film actors
German male stage actors
German male silent film actors
Actors from Karlsruhe
20th-century German male actors